The Book of Jasher, also called Pseudo-Jasher, is an eighteenth-century literary forgery by Jacob Ilive. It purports to be an English translation by Flaccus Albinus Alcuinus of the lost Book of Jasher. It is sometimes called Pseudo-Jasher to distinguish it from the midrashic Sefer haYashar (Book of the Upright, Naples, 1552), which incorporates genuine Jewish legend.

Details
Published in November 1750, the title page of the book says: "translated into English by Flaccus Albinus Alcuinus, of Britain, Abbot of Canterbury, who went on a pilgrimage into the Holy Land and Persia, where he discovered this volume in the city of Gazna." The book claims to be written by Jasher, son of Caleb, one of Moses's lieutenants, who later judged Israel at Shiloh. The book covers biblical history from the creation down to Jasher's own day and was represented as the Lost Book of Jasher mentioned in the Bible.

The provenance of the text was immediately suspect: the eighth-century cleric Alcuin could not have produced a translation in the English of the King James Bible. There is an introductory account by Alcuin of his discovery of the manuscript in Persia and its history since the time of Jasher, and a commendation by John Wycliffe.

Reception 
The supposed lost book was declared an obvious hoax by the Monthly Review in the December of the year of publication, and the printer Jacob Ilive was sentenced in 1756 to three years in jail for this fraud and for his radical anti-religious pamphlets.

In 1829, a slightly revised and enlarged edition was published in Bristol, provoking attacks against it. Photographic reproduction of this 1829 edition was published in 1934 by the Rosicrucians in San Jose, California, who declared it an inspired work.

See also 
 Sefer haYashar for other books with similar titles.

References

Bibliography
 The Book of Jasher: One of the Sacred Books of the Bible Long Lost or Undiscovered, Flaccus A. Alcuinus (translator) (Kessinger Publishing Company, 1993) 	
 The Book of Jasher: with Testimonies and Notes by Flaccus Albinus Alcuinus of Britain (CPA Books, 1998).

External links
 PDF: The Hidden Bible (Book of Jasher 1829 Bristol edition with testimonies and notes)
 Scanned text: Open Library Project (1829 text, and other formats)

Literary forgeries
Modern pseudepigrapha
Religious hoaxes
Works in the style of the King James Version
1750 books